Balbegovići is a village in the municipality of Ilijaš, Bosnia and Herzegovina.

Demographics 
According to the 2013 census, its population was 110.

References

Populated places in Ilijaš
Serb communities in the Federation of Bosnia and Herzegovina